Pottinger or Pöttinger may refer to:

People
Pottinger
 Allison Pottinger (b. 1973), American curler
 Damien Pottinger (b. 1982), Canadian professional soccer player
 Don Pottinger (1919–1986), Scottish officer of arms and heraldic author
 Doug Pottinger (b. 1973), American curler
 Eldred Pottinger (1811–1843), Anglo-Indian soldier and diplomat
 Frederick William Pottinger (1831–1865), Australian police inspector
 George Pottinger (1916–1998), Scottish civil servant involved in the John Poulson scandal
 Henry Pottinger (1789–1856), British soldier and first governor of Hong Kong
 Henry Pottinger Stephens (1851–1903), English dramatist and journalist
 Jay Pottinger (b. 1983), Canadian football linebacker
 John Stanley Pottinger (b. 1940), American lawyer, banker, novelist
 Julie Pottinger (b. 1970), American historical romance novelist
 Matthew Pottinger (b. 1973), American journalist and U.S. Marine, son of John Stanley Pottinger
 Rose Rita Pottinger, fictional character in the Lewis Barnavelt book series
 Sonia Pottinger (1931-2010), Jamaican reggae record producer
 Tinks Pottinger (b. 1956), New Zealand horsewoman and bronze medalist

Pöttinger
 Josef Pöttinger (1903–1970), German football player
 Markus Pöttinger (b. 1978), former ice hockey player of Munich

Places
 Pottinger (District Electoral Area), Belfast, Northern Ireland
 Belfast Pottinger (Northern Ireland Parliament constituency) (1922-1973)
 Belfast Pottinger (UK Parliament constituency) (1918–1922)
 Pottinger County, New South Wales, Australia
 Pottinger Peak, Hong Kong
 Pottinger Point, South Shetland Islands, Antarctica
 Pottinger Street, Hong Kong

Other
 Bell Pottinger, a London-based public relations company
 Pottinger (Australia), an Australian M&A advisory company
 Pottinger Baronets

See also
 Pettinger, a similar surname